Battle of Chios may refer to:
 Battle of Chios (201 BC), a sea battle between Macedonia and an alliance headed by Rhodes and Pergamum
 Battle of Chios (1319), a sea battle between the Knights Hospitaller and Turkish corsairs
 Battle of Chios (1822), also known as the Chios massacre, a suppression of Greek revolt and massacre of the island's population by Ottoman forces
 Battle of Chios (1912), a conquest of the island by Greece involving the 1st Infantry Regiment

See also
 Battle of Chesma
 Battle of Embata
 Battle of the Oinousses Islands